Giovanni Roma (2 March 1928 – 9 August 2007) was an Italian racing cyclist. He finished in seventh place in the 1953 Giro d'Italia.

References

External links
 

1928 births
2007 deaths
Italian male cyclists
Place of birth missing
Cyclists from the Province of Treviso